Guzmania coriostachya is a plant species in the genus Guzmania, and is native to Costa Rica, Panama, Colombia, Venezuela and Ecuador.

References

coriostachya
Flora of Costa Rica
Flora of Panama
Flora of South America
Plants described in 1865